Science and nature may refer to:

Science & Nature (The Bluetones album), 2000
Science & Nature (Inkubus Sukkubus album), 2007